The following events occurred in September 1924:

September 1, 1924 (Monday)
Japan observed two minutes of silence nationwide beginning at 11:58 a.m., one year to the day after the Great Kantō earthquake.
A hurricane struck the Virgin Islands, leaving 80 people feared dead. 
The Russian All-Military Union was founded in the Kingdom of Serbs, Croats and Slovenes.
The film The Side Show of Life, starring Ernest Torrence, was released.

September 2, 1924 (Tuesday)
Germany made its first payment of 20 million gold marks under the Dawes Plan.
It was reported from Moscow that a bomb had been found in Lenin's Tomb.
Born: Daniel arap Moi, President of Kenya, in Sacho, Kenya (d. 2020); Sidney Phillips, noted World War II veteran (The War), in Mobile, Alabama (d. 2015)
Died: Dario Resta, 40, Italian Briton race car driver (racecourse crash)

September 3, 1924 (Wednesday)
The "Saber noise" (ruido de sables) incident took place in Chile when a group of young military officers rattled their sabers within their scabbards in a political protest.
Born: Mary Grace Canfield, actress, in Rochester, New York (d. 2014)

September 4, 1924 (Thursday)
British Prime Minister Ramsay MacDonald made a frank speech to the League of Nations Assembly in Geneva saying that history had demonstrated that military alliances were no guarantor of security, and that to provide security Germany and Russia must be admitted to the League. He also said that the ability to assign responsibility for aggression belonged to historians fifty years after a war, not to contemporary politicians, and only through arbitration could such responsibility be assigned. "If we cannot devise proper arbitration let us go back to competitive armaments and military pacts and prepare for the inevitable next war", MacDonald stated. To small nations he said, "Pact or no pact, you will be invaded, devastated and crushed. You are certain to be the victims of the military age."
Born: Joan Aiken, writer, in Rye, East Sussex, England (d. 2004); Anita Snellman, Finnish painter (d. 2006)

September 5, 1924 (Friday)
The Trades Union Congress at Hull voted to take industrial action to stop war if necessary.
The round-the-world flyers entered American airspace and landed near Brunswick, Maine in a dense fog.
Born: Paul Dietzel, American football player and coach, in Fremont, Ohio (d. 2013)

September 6, 1924 (Saturday)
The 4th Miss America Pageant was won by Miss Philadelphia, Ruth Malcomson. The 1922 and 1923 winner, Mary Katherine Campbell, placed 1st Runner-Up; this was the last time that previous winners were eligible to enter the pageant again.
John Dillinger made his first attempt at a major crime when he and a friend attempted to rob a grocery store in Mooresville, Indiana. The two were shortly apprehended and sent to jail.
Died: Archduchess Marie Valerie of Austria, 56

September 7, 1924 (Sunday)
Spanish dictator Miguel Primo de Rivera issued a manifesto to the army appealing for an extension of his emergency powers, saying, "One year is too short a time to attempt to carry out the work which lay before the directorio when we assumed power."
The film Dante's Inferno was released.
Born: Daniel Inouye, politician and World War II hero, in Honolulu, Hawaii (d. 2012)

September 8, 1924 (Monday)
The round-the-world flyers landed at Mitchel Field on Long Island, New York. The Prince of Wales was among the crowd that greeted them.
Born: Mimi Parent, surrealist artist, in Montreal, Quebec, Canada (d. 2005)
Died: Archduchess Helena of Austria, 20, six days after her daughter's birth

September 9, 1924 (Tuesday)
Marines from the United States, Great Britain, Japan and Italy were deployed in Shanghai to protect their nations' interests as civil war appeared imminent in China.
The Kohat Riots began in British India.
The League of Nations began drafting a plan to take over the supervision of Germany's disarmament.
President Calvin Coolidge waited for four hours in the rain to greet the round-the-world flyers at Bolling Field in Washington, D.C.
Born: Jane Greer, actress, in Washington, D.C. (d. 2001); Russell M. Nelson, President of the Church of Jesus Christ of Latter-day Saints, in Salt Lake City (alive in 2021); Rik Van Steenbergen, cyclist, in Arendonk, Belgium (d. 2003)

September 10, 1924 (Wednesday)
The Leopold and Loeb trial ended with a sentence of life imprisonment instead of the death penalty the state had sought.
The football club Cúcuta Deportivo was founded in Cúcuta, Colombia.
Born: Ted Kluszewski, baseball player, in Argo, Illinois (d. 1988)

September 11, 1924 (Thursday)
The September Junta was established in Chile.
In boxing, Harry Wills was awarded a newspaper decision over Louis Firpo in Jersey City, New Jersey.
Born: Tom Landry, American football player and coach, in Mission, Texas (d. 2000); Rudolf Vrba, noted Holocaust survivor, in Topoľčany, Czechoslovakia (d. 2006)

September 12, 1924 (Friday)
Chilean President Arturo Alessandri fled to Argentina.
An Italian Fascist deputy, Armando Casalini, was shot dead on a tramway by a communist.
The Nestorian rebellion begins.

September 13, 1924 (Saturday)
French general Jean Degoutte allowed all functionaries and other public employees ousted or deported from the Ruhr since the occupation began to return to work.
Born: Maurice Jarre, composer and conductor, in Lyon, France (d. 2009)

September 14, 1924 (Sunday)
A helicopter designed by Étienne Oehmichen lifted a 400-pound cargo 1 meter and 10 centimeters off the ground, winning a prize offered by the French government.
The film The Alaskan premiered.
Born: Davidson Nicol, academic, diplomat and writer, in Freetown, Sierra Leone (d. 1994)

September 15, 1924 (Monday)
The Second Zhili–Fengtian War began in China.
German astronomer Friedrich Simon Archenhold said that he saw what he believed to be an attempt by inhabitants of Mars to contact Earth. "I cannot disclose everything I saw", Archenhold stated. "I am a scientist and I am not seeking newspaper sensations, but this much I will say – I was thunderstruck by what I saw. I could not believe my eyes. I thought perhaps my sons had climbed on the observatory roof and had planted something in the telescope, but it was not so. I am now going to Jungfrau, Milan, and other observatories to discuss my findings with other scientists seeking an answer to the question of whether there is life on Mars."
The German government decided to postpone any attempt to join the League of Nations until the next year.
The round-the-world flyers arrived in Chicago, conducting a fly-over of the city escorted by a dozen army planes.
Saks Fifth Avenue historic flagship store opening.
Born: Bobby Short, cabaret singer and pianist, in Danville, Illinois (d. 2005)
Died: Frank Chance, 48, American baseball player

September 16, 1924 (Tuesday)
Jim Bottomley of the St. Louis Cardinals set a new major league baseball record for RBIs in a single game with 12, during a 17–3 win over the Brooklyn Robins. The record was tied by Mark Whiten in 1993 but has never been broken.
Born: Lauren Bacall, actress, in the Bronx, New York (d. 2014)

September 17, 1924 (Wednesday)
Prince Wolfgang of Hesse married Princess Marie Alexandra of Baden over the objections of Wolfgang's uncle, ex-kaiser Wilhem II.
Died: John Martin Schaeberle, 71, German-American astronomer

September 18, 1924 (Thursday)
Mahatma Gandhi began a twenty-one day fast of despair over the recent riots between Hindus and Muslims.
Born: Neville Chittick, British archaeologist (d. 1984)

September 19, 1924 (Friday)
The round-the-world flyers flew from Muskogee, Oklahoma to Love Field in Dallas, Texas where they were greeted by a crowd of 7,500 people.
Born: Don Harron, actor, director and writer, in Toronto, Ontario, Canada (d. 2015); Suchitra Mitra, singer, in Bengal, British India (d. 2011)

September 20, 1924 (Saturday)
Chicago Cubs pitcher Grover Cleveland Alexander won the 300th game of his career, pitching all 12 innings of a 7–3 win over the New York Giants.
The Nuns of the Battlefield monument by Jerome Connor was dedicated in Washington, D.C.
Born: Hermann Buhl, mountaineer, in Innsbruck, Austria (d. 1957)

September 21, 1924 (Sunday)
U.S. President Calvin Coolidge condemned socialism in a speech in Washington made during the closing exercises of a convention of the Society of the Holy Name. "Socialism and communism cannot be reconciled with the principles which our institutions represent", Coolidge said in a statement interpreted as a criticism of rival presidential candidate Robert M. La Follette. "They are entirely foreign, entirely un-American. We stand wholly committed to the policy that what the individual produces belongs entirely to him to be used to the benefit of himself, to provide for his own family and to enable him to serve his fellow man."
The action film Roaring Rails, starring Harry Carey, was released.
The rugby union club FC Barcelona Rugby was formed in Spain.
The Swedish Social Democratic Party maintained its plurality in the Swedish general election.

September 22, 1924 (Monday)
The Roosevelt Hotel opened in Manhattan.
The round-the-world flyers landed at Rockwell Field in San Diego.
Born: Charles Keeping, illustrator, in Lambeth, London, England (d. 1988); Rosamunde Pilcher, writer, in Lelant, Cornwall, England (d. 2019); Gerald Schoenfeld, chairman of the Shubert Organization, in New York City (d. 2008)

September 23, 1924 (Tuesday)
The German cabinet announced it had decided "to direct the efforts of the German government towards German entrance into the League of Nations in the near future, but only with the status of a great power having equal rights with other great powers." It set three conditions for its application: it would never again admit responsibility for starting the war, it would receive a council seat, and it would not be a member of the executive council, meaning that Germany would not send a quota of troops in an international action, nor would it give the League the right to cross German territory. It listed a further seven points classified as "wishes", including that the occupation of the Ruhr would end earlier than agreed upon and that Germany could regain its colonial interests.
Born: Heinrich Schultz, cultural functionary, in Valga, Estonia (d. 2012)

September 24, 1924 (Wednesday)
Dazzy Vance of the Brooklyn Robins became only the sixth pitcher in major-league history to throw an immaculate inning, striking out all three batters on nine total pitches in the third inning of a 6–5 win over the Chicago Cubs.
The experimental short film Ballet Mécanique, directed by Fernand Léger and Dudley Murphy with a musical score by George Antheil, premiered in Vienna.
Born: Nina Bocharova, Soviet/Ukrainian gymnast (d. 2020)

September 25, 1924 (Thursday)
English motorist Malcolm Campbell set a new land speed record at Pendine Sands in Wales with a speed of 146.16 mph (235.22 km/h) in a Sunbeam 350HP.
Died: Lotta Crabtree, 76, American stage actress

September 26, 1924 (Friday)
30 were reported dead in flooding in Leningrad.
Born: Ozzie Cadena, record producer, in Oklahoma City, Oklahoma (d. 2008)
Died: Walter Long, 1st Viscount Long, 70, British politician

September 27, 1924 (Saturday)
The New York Giants clinched the National League pennant with a 5–1 win over the Philadelphia Phillies.
British Prime Minister Ramsay MacDonald told a gathering in Derby that his government had secured many valuable concessions in its treaties with the Soviet Union and if the House of Commons failed to ratify them, he would send the country to another general election.

September 28, 1924 (Sunday)
The aviators in the round-the-world flight expedition completed their journey by landing at Sand Point in Seattle. The entire trip took 175 days and covered 27,553 miles.
The Cecil B. DeMille-directed film Feet of Clay was released.
The Nestorian rebellion ends.

September 29, 1924 (Monday)
The Washington Senators clinched their first American League pennant in franchise history with a 4–2 win over the Boston Red Sox.
Benito Mussolini announced plans to build the world's highest skyscraper in Rome. Italian architect Mario Palanti proposed a 1,500-foot high pyramidal structure with 4,500 rooms, featuring a concert hall and a huge gymnasium for the training of Olympic athletes.
The Dominican Republic was admitted to the League of Nations.

September 30, 1924 (Tuesday)
The Allied Powers relaxed controls on the German Navy in light of improved international relations.
The League of Nations appointed a commission to look into the Mosul Question. 
The German romance film Comedy of the Heart was released.
Born: Truman Capote, writer and actor, in New Orleans, Louisiana (d. 1984)

References

1924
1924-09
1924-09